The collared flycatcher (Ficedula albicollis) is a small passerine bird in the Old World flycatcher family, one of the four species of Western Palearctic black-and-white flycatchers.  It breeds in southeast Europe (isolated populations are present in the islands of Gotland and Öland in the Baltic Sea, Sweden) and Eastern France to the Balkan Peninsula and Ukraine and is migratory, wintering in sub Sahara Africa. It is a rare vagrant in western Europe.

This is a 12–13.5 cm long bird. The breeding male is mainly black above and white below, with a white collar, large white wing patch, black tail (although some males have white tail sides) and a large white forehead patch. It has a pale rump. The bill is black and has the broad but pointed shape typical of aerial insectivores. As well as taking insects in flight, this species hunts caterpillars amongst the oak foliage, and will take berries.

Non-breeding males, females and juveniles have the black replaced by a pale brown, and may be very difficult to distinguish from other Ficedula flycatchers, particularly the European pied flycatcher (F. hypoleuca) and the semicollared flycatcher (F. semitorquata), with which this species hybridizes to a limited extent. F. albicollis vis-a-vis F. hypoleuca are speciating from each other by reinforcement, as evidenced by differences between colouration in sympatry versus allopatry. This is evidence for speciation by reinforcement.

They are birds of deciduous woodlands, parks and gardens, with a preference for old trees with cavities in which it nests. They build an open nest in a tree hole, or man-made nest-boxes. Normally 5-7 eggs are laid. The song is slow strained whistles, quite unlike the pied flycatcher. Pied flycatchers can mimic the song of the collared flycatcher in sympatric populations.

The genus name is from Latin and refers to a small fig-eating bird (ficus, "fig") supposed to change into the blackcap in winter. The specific albicollis is from Latin albus, white, and  collum,  "neck".

The collared flycatcher is used as a model species in both ecology and genetics and it was one of the first birds that had its full genome sequenced. Repeated spectrometric data taken from male Collared Flycatchers has revealed that plumage reflectance should be measured during courtship, the primary period of sexual signalling, with spectral traits declining over the breeding season.

In a natural population of F. albicollis inbreeding appeared to be rare, but when it did occur it had severe negative consequences for fitness characteristics such as hatching success rate.

References

External links 
Collared flycatcher genome on Ensembl

collared flycatcher
Birds of Europe
Birds of East Africa
Birds of Central Africa
Birds of Southern Africa
collared flycatcher